 

Helmut Beck-Broichsitter (30 August 1914 – 25 September 2000) was a German military police officer during World War II. Following the war, Beck-Broichsitter was involved in several neo-Nazi movements.

Career
Beck-Broichsitter became a member of the Nazi Party in 1931, of the Sturmabteilung in 1932 and of the police in 1939. In the years till 1944 he served in Feldgendarmerie units that took part in rear-security operations (Bandenbekämpfung) in the occupied Soviet Union.

After the war Beck-Broichsitter founded the "Bruderschaft" (Fraternity) in 1949 of former officers of the Wehrmacht and his emphasis was on opposing Bolshevism. Accused of spying for the Federal Office for the Protection of the Constitution, he resigned from the leadership. He later joined the openly Nazi-orientated Socialist Reich Party.

Awards 
 Knight's Cross of the Iron Cross on 4 September 1940 as Oberleutnant and Chef of 14.(Panzer-Jäger)/Infanterie-Regiment "Großdeutschland"

References

 Breitman, Richard and Goda, Norman J. W. (2010). Hitler's shadow: Nazi war criminals, U.S. intelligence, and the Cold War. DIANE Publishing, .
 Brunner, Bernhard (2004). Der Frankreich-Komplex: die nationalsozialistischen Verbrechen in Frankreich und die Justiz der Bundesrepublik Deutschland. (in German). Wallstein. .

External links
Beate Baldow, Episode oder Gefahr? Die Naumann-Affäre. Diss. phil. FU Berlin 2012, passim about Beck-Broichsitter and his "brotherhood" of old Nazis (Deutsche Bruderschaft) in post-war times (in German)

1914 births
2000 deaths
Military personnel from Kiel
People from the Province of Schleswig-Holstein
Recipients of the Knight's Cross of the Iron Cross
Politicians from Kiel
German Army officers of World War II
Socialist Reich Party politicians